Nikiforov is a Russian masculine surname, its feminine counterpart is Nikiforova. Notable people with the surname include:

Aleksey Nikiforov (born 1957), Lithuanian ice hockey player 
Evgeni Nikiforov (born 1993), Russian ice hockey forward
Galin Nikiforov (born 1968), Bulgarian writer
Ilya Nikiforov (born 1970), Russian lawyer
Maria Nikiforova (1885–1919), Ukrainian partisan leader
Nikolay Nikiforov (born 1982), Russian politician
Oleksandr Nikiforov (born 1967), Ukrainian football player
Pyotr Nikiforov (1882–1974), Russian revolutionary
Viktor Nikiforov (1931–1989), Soviet ice hockey player
Vladislav Nikiforov (born 1989), Russian football player
Vyacheslav Nikiforov (born 1966), Russian football player
Yevgeny Nikiforov (born 1970), Russian General
Yuriy Nikiforov (born 1970), Ukrainian-Russian football coach and a former player 

Russian-language surnames